Marine Fusilier Regiments (RFM or Marine Rifle Regiments) in  are marine infantry regiments belonging to the Algerian Navy.

They are the Algerian equivalents of the USMC.

History 
The first Marine Rifle Battalions were created in 1986, the officer behind the creation of these units was General Abdelmadjid Chérif.

The Marine Riflemen, like the Parachute Commandos of the Algerian Land Forces, are recognised as elite units of the Algerian Army. Moreover, following the creation of these units, the Navy wanted to have a landing force that could operate in amphibious zones and that could lead to an operation in depth like their parachute counterparts in the Army.

The Marine Riflemen are also a rapid-action and specialised operations force, they are fully autonomous and have their own logistics, combat and support capabilities.

However, it was in 2005 that the Marine Commandos Corps was created with the release of its first class.

Organization 
The Marine Rifle Regiments have an organization quite similar to their Parachute Commando counterparts in the Algerian Land Forces.

There are currently 8 identified Marine Rifle Regiments:

 1st Marine Fusiliers Regiment "Martyr Housh Mohamed" of Jijel ( Al-Fawj Al'awal Lilrumat al-Bahriiyn "Al-Shahid Housh Mohamed)
 3rd Marine Fusiliers Regiment of Azzefoun ( Al-Fawj Al'awal Lilrumat al-Bahriiyn)
 4th Marine Fusiliers Regiment of El Milia ( Al-Fawj al'rrabie Lilrumat al-Bahriiyn)
 5th Marine Fusiliers Regiment of Ténès ( Al-Fawj Al'awal Lilrumat al-Bahriiyn)
 7th Marine Fusiliers Regiment of Boumerdes ( Al-Fawj Al'awal Lilrumat al-Bahriiyn)
 ?? Marine Fusiliers Regiment of Dellys ( Al-Fawj Al'awal Lilrumat al-Bahriiyn) ?? Marine Fusiliers Regiment of Mers-El-Kebir ( Al-Fawj Al'awal Lilrumat al-Bahriiyn)
 12th Coastal Artillery Regiment of Collo "Martyr Ferendi Mohamed" (  Al-Fawj 12 Lilmadfaeiat al-Sahiliat "al-Shahid Ferendi Mohamed)

The operational organization 
The Marine Rifle Regiments are organized like all the regiments of the Algerian Army:

 1 General staff
 3 Fighting companies
 1 Logistics company
 1 Anti-tank company
 1 Recognition and support company
 1 Transmission company

Tasks 
Marine Fusiliers act primarily in the amphibious environment, in the maquis and on the seaside, Marine Fusiliers provide the material and human resources that enable them to carry out their missions, hence their autonomy.

With the other units of the Algerian Navy, Army and Air Force, it therefore deals with all operations in strategic areas, at depth and in hostile environments, such as :

 Special reconnaissance
 Specialized action in depth
 Counter-terrorism on land and at sea
 Amphibious support and sustainment to special operations (with special forces)
 Recovery, protection and surveillance of strategic points
 The fight against illicit trafficking at sea and on the Algerian coast
 Protection of the Algerian coast from various threats (pollution, traffic...)
 Securing the Algerian maritime space
 Search and Rescue Support
 The protection of strategic points belonging to the Algerian Navy.

Training 
Marine Riflemen are trained at the Marine Rifle and Diver School (EFMP) in Jijel. This school trains Marine Riflemen, Marine Commandos and Combat Divers of the Algerian Navy and other army corps.

Following his training, the student will be incorporated into a Marine Rifle Regiment and will then be able to pass specialized training such as mine clearance... or pass the selection and training to become a Marine Commando.

In addition, Marine Riflemen also take part in training sessions abroad, notably in the United States with the USMC, the US Army and the US NAVY, in Italy with the San Marco Regiment, and in Spain with the FGNE and the Marine Infantry units.

Equipment and armaments

Armament

Handgun 

 Glock 17 & 18
 Caracal

Assault rifle

 AKMS
 AKM
 Type 56

Machine gun

 PKM
 RPK

Precision rifle

 Zatsava M93 Black Arrow
 SVD

Others

 RPG 7

Individual equipment 

 Spectra Helmet
 Algerian Army lattice with DPM camouflage
 Tactical vest
 Bullet-proof vest
 Gloves
 Knee and elbow pads
 Thigh Holster (and Belt Holster)
 Rangers
 Protective goggles
 Camelback
 Fighting bag
 Communication Headset

Vehicles 

 Mercedes-Benz G Class 
 Toyota Land Cruiser
 Nissan Patrol
 Mercedes-Benz Zetros
 Mercedes-Benz Unimog
 SNVI M 120
 SNVI M 230
 SNVI M 260

Special vehicles 

 BTR 80

Support vessels 

 BDSL Kalaat Beni Abbes of San Giorgio class
 Kalaat Beni Class Landing Vessel
 Landing ship Polnochny class

Aeral 

 MI-17 of the Algerian Air Force

References

Algerian National Navy